Parallelity or Parallelities may refer to:

Parallelity of the pole faces of an electromagnet in Shim (magnetism)
Parallelities, novel by Alan Dean Foster

See also
Parallel (disambiguation), parallelity is the condition of being parallel
Parallelism (disambiguation)
Parallel universe (disambiguation)